John Timothy McNicholas, O.P. (December 15, 1877 – April 22, 1950) was an Irish-born prelate of the Roman Catholic Church. A Dominican, he served as bishop of the Diocese of Duluth in Minnesota (1918–1925) and archbishop of the Archdiocese of Cincinnati in Ohio (1925–1950).

Biography

Early life and education 
Timothy McNicholas was born in Kiltimagh, County Mayo, the youngest of eight children of Patrick J. and Mary (née Mullany) McNicholas. In 1881, he and his family emigrated to the United States, where they settled in Chester, Pennsylvania. He received his early education at Immaculate Heart of Mary School in Chester, and then attended St. Joseph's Preparatory College in Philadelphia. In 1894, at age 17, he entered the Order of Friars Preachers (more commonly known as the Dominicans) at St. Rose Priory in Springfield, Kentucky. He continued his studies at St. Joseph Priory in Somerset, Ohio

Priesthood 
McNicholas was ordained to the priesthood by Bishop Henry K. Moeller on October 10, 1901. Following his ordination, McNicholas went to Rome to study in the Dominican studium at Santa Maria sopra Minerva, where he obtained a Doctor of Sacred Theology degree in 1904. 

McNicholas returned to the United States later in 1904 and assumed the role of master of novices at St. Joseph Priory in Somerset. The following year he was sent to Immaculate Conception College in Washington, D.C., where he served as regent of studies and professor of philosophy, theology, and canon law. He contributed a number of articles to the Catholic Encyclopedia.

In 1909, McNicholas became the national director of the Holy Name Society, headquartered in New York City. He also served as the first editor of the Holy Name Journal and as pastor of St. Catherine of Siena Parish in New York He remained in New York until 1917, when he returned to Rome as an assistant to the Master of the Order of Preachers and a professor of theology and canon law at the Pontifical University of St. Thomas Aquinas.

Bishop of Duluth 
On July 18, 1918, McNicholas was appointed the second bishop of the Diocese of Duluth by Pope Benedict XV. He received his episcopal consecration on September 8, 1918, from Cardinal Tommaso Pio Boggiani, with Archbishop Bonaventura Cerretti and Bishop Hermann Esser serving as co-consecrators. His installation took place in Duluth on November 15 1918. He was raised to the rank of an assistant at the pontifical throne in 1923.

Archbishop of Cincinnati 
In May 1925, McNicholas was named Bishop of Indianapolis, Indiana, to succeed Bishop Joseph Chartrand, who was appointed Archbishop of Cincinnati. However, he never occupied that post due to Chartrand's rejection of his own appointment. Instead, McNicholas was appointed the fourth archbishop of the Archdiocese of Cincinnati by Pope Pius XI on July 8, 1925. His installation took place at St. Peter in Chains Cathedral on August 12, 1925.

During the 1928 presidential election, which featured the first Catholic to win a major party nomination in the person of Al Smith, McNicholas addressed concerns that Smith would take orders from church leaders in Rome in making decisions affecting the country by declaring, "We, as American Catholics, owe no civil allegiance to the Vatican State."

While observing the conversion of a group of seventy African Americans to Roman Catholicism in Cincinnati, McNicholas said,"I earnestly ask all our colored citizens to consider the position of the Catholic Church, to study her teachings, to realize that her ceremonials, her processions, her music, are full of a profound meaning which, if understood, could not fail to stir the deepest emotion of the colored race."During his tenure as archbishop, McNicholas raised the level of Catholic education at all levels throughout the archdiocese and the country. He served as president-general of the National Catholic Education Association (1946-1950) and national chairman of the Catholic Student Mission Crusade and held a thirteen-year membership on the Episcopal Committee for Confraternity of Christian Doctrine. He also served on the board of Catholic University of America. Between 1945 and 1950, he held five terms as chair of the Administration Board of the National Catholic Welfare Conference.

In 1948, Pope Pius XII wrote to McNicholas, in his capacity as NCWC chairman, a letter urging the United States to help European Displaced Persons by accepting them as immigrants. The letter, later quoted in the Church's 1952 document Exsul Familia on the rights of refugees, declares that such refugees sometimes have a right in natural law to be admitted to rich countries: "The sovereignty of the State, although it must be respected, cannot be exaggerated to the point that access to this land is, for inadequate or unjustified reasons, denied to needy and decent people from other nations, provided of course, that the public wealth, considered very carefully, does not forbid this."

Death and legacy 
On April 22,1950, at the age of 72, John McNicholas died from a heart attack at his residence in the College Hill neighborhood of Cincinnati.Archbishop McNicholas High School in Cincinnati was named in his honor.

Viewpoints

Anti-Semitism 
In 1938, McNicholas condemned the persecution of Jews in Nazi Germany and elsewhere, declaring that the German treatment of Jews "deserves the condemnation of all right-thinking men" and was "irrational and inhuman." He also denounced the policies of the "madman Hitler" and said that there was "little essential difference between his brand of fascism and the Bolshevism of Stalin." That same year, he issued a pastoral letter in which he wrote,"Governments that have no fixed standards of morality, and consequently no moral sense, can scarcely settle the question of war on moral grounds for Christians ... who see and know the injustice of practically all wars in our modern pagan world. There is the very practical question for informed Christians who acknowledge the supreme dominion of God ... Will such Christians in our country form a mighty league of conscientious non-combatants?"

Media morality 
In response to Archbishop Amleto Giovanni Cicognani's call for a movement to counteract the influence of "salacious cinema", McNicholas founded the Catholic Legion of Decency (later renamed the National Legion of Decency) in 1933. The organization, which at the height of its influence claimed to have more than 22,000,000 Catholic members, sought to influence decency standards and boycott films deemed offensive by the Catholic Church.

Social justice 
During the Great Depression, McNicholas advocated "conscription of excess wealth" as "wholly in harmony with the principles of Christian social justice" and named extreme concentration of wealth as one of the "crimes of the country". He also said the state could not place on charity the full burden of caring for the unemployed.

Ecumenism 
In 1931, McNicholas joined clergymen of various faiths in speaking over "The Church in the Air", a CBS radio program. However, he strongly prohibited Catholics from participating in non-Catholic religious ceremonies, saying, "The Catholic Church cannot give the impression that one religion is as good as another or that she must strive with those of other faiths for a common denominator in religion."

References

External links
 

Archbishop McNicholas High School website

1877 births
1950 deaths
Irish emigrants to the United States (before 1923)
20th-century Roman Catholic archbishops in the United States
Roman Catholic bishops of Duluth
Roman Catholic archbishops of Cincinnati
Religious leaders from County Mayo
People from Delaware County, Pennsylvania
Catholics from Pennsylvania
Contributors to the Catholic Encyclopedia
Dominican bishops